Starford To'a (born 23 June 2000) is a professional rugby league footballer who plays as a er,  or  for the Wests Tigers in the NRL. 

He previously played for the Newcastle Knights in the National Rugby League.

Background
To'a was born in Auckland, New Zealand and is of Tongan, Māori and European descent. He attended St Paul's College, Auckland.

Playing career

Early years
In 2018, he moved to Australia to play for the Newcastle Knights, after being scouted by a recruitment manager for the Knights in 2016 at a New Zealand national tournament in Rotorua. He played for the Knights' Jersey Flegg Cup team. At the end of 2018, he played for the Australian Schoolboys and was named man of the match in their first game.Denga fosi’i

2019
In 2019, To'a joined the Knights' NRL squad for pre-season training and played in a first-grade trial match. In June, he re-signed with the Knights on a 2-year contract until the end of 2021. In round 25 of the 2019 NRL season, he made his NRL debut for the Knights against the Penrith Panthers and scored a try. On 29 September, he will play for the Junior Kiwis against the Junior Kangaroos.

2020
He made seven appearances for Newcastle in the 2020 NRL season and scored four tries. To'a did not feature in the club's first finals campaign since 2013.

2021
In 2021, To'a made 12 appearances for the Knights, scoring 6 tries.

2022
In January 2022, To'a was granted a release from the final two years of his Newcastle contract to join the Wests Tigers on a two-year contract effective immediately.
To'a played a total of 21 matches for the Wests Tigers in the 2022 NRL season and scored 3 tries as the club finished bottom of the table and claimed the Wooden Spoon for the first time.

References

External links
Newcastle Knights profile

2000 births
New Zealand rugby league players
Newcastle Knights players
Wests Tigers players
Western Suburbs Magpies NSW Cup players
Junior Kiwis players
Rugby league fullbacks
Rugby league centres
Rugby league wingers
Rugby league players from Auckland
Living people
People educated at St Paul's College, Auckland